Laurencekirk, colloquially known as "The Lang Toun" or amongst locals as simply "The Kirk" although these have fallen out of common use, is a small town in the historic county of Kincardineshire, Scotland, just off the A90 Dundee to Aberdeen main road. It is administered as part of Aberdeenshire. It is the largest settlement in the Howe o' the Mearns area and houses the local secondary school; Mearns Academy, which was established in 1895 and awarded the Charter Mark in 2003.

Its old name was Conveth, an anglification of the Gaelic Coinmheadh, referring to an obligation to provide free food and board to passing troops.  Laurencekirk is in the valley between the Hill of Garvock and the Cairn O' Mount. The famous landmark of the Johnston Tower can be seen on the peak of the Garvock.

Laurencekirk was, in the past, known for making snuff boxes with a special type of airtight hinge (known as a "Laurencekirk hinge") invented by James Sandy.

The Laurencekirk Golf Club, now defunct, was founded in the early 1900s but by 1951 it had been wound up.

Services
Laurencekirk has two public houses; The Crown and The Royal.

Laurencekirk Primary school was built in 1999 and Mearns Academy, the senior school, opened in a new building in August 2014.  The Community Centre, Library and Police Station are housed within the Mearns Campus. There are two public parks, both with children's play areas, and in addition the memorial park houses a bowling green and a skate-board facility.

There are two churches, a Church of Scotland and St Laurence's Church, an Episcopalian Church which is part of the Diocese of Brechin. In 1693 the Episcopalians had been driven from the parish kirk in the aftermath of the Glorious Revolution. A new meeting house was built at nearby Redmyre, though this was destroyed in 1746. The Episcopalians built a chapel dedicated to St Laurence in Laurencekirk 1791 which took in the congregations of Redmyre and Luthermuir. The current St Laurence' was opened in 1873 and now also serves the congregations of Drumtochty, Fasque and Drumlithie. its archives are held at the University of Dundee as part of the Brechin Diocese's Archives.

Local landmarks 

Johnston Tower was built to commemorate the Duke of Wellington's victory over Napoleon in the Peninsular War. It is situated on the Garvock Hill alongside a wind farm. The neighbouring residence, Johnston Lodge, was built in 1780 by James Farquhar, MP for Aberdeen Burghs and later for Portalington. The house was later owned by Lord Gardenstone.

Gallery

Local radio 
Alongside the commercial enterprise of the local newspaper, The Kincardineshire Observer (often referred to as The Squeeker) which was first published in 1902, Laurencekirk has a Local Community Radio Station in Mearns FM. 
Broadcasting from nearby Stonehaven in the Townhall, Mearns FM helps to keep Laurencekirk up to date with local and charity events, as well as playing a wee bit of music. Staffed completely by volunteers, Mearns FM is run as a not for profit organisation, broadcasting under a Community Radio licence, with a remit to provide local focus news events and programming.  Jointly funded by local adverts and local and national grants. Mearns FM has one of the largest listening areas of any Community Radio Station owing to the Mearns' distributed population,  Mearns FM was set up to try to bring these distant communities together.

Transport 
The Dundee–Aberdeen line passes through the town. The railway station, which closed to passengers in 1967, was re-opened on 17 May 2009.  The opening of this station has affirmed Laurencekirk's status as a commuter town providing links to Aberdeen, Dundee and beyond.

The Laurencekirk bypass opened in 1985 as part of the project to dual the road between Perth and Aberdeen. The bypass is now part of the A90. A grade-separated (flyover) junction is planned for access to Laurencekirk, eliminating a flat crossing where numerous accidents have occurred. However, in 2021 it was revealed the project had been delayed.

In literature
Lewis Grassic Gibbon wrote much about The Mearns and the surrounding area in his book Sunset Song. A tribute centre can be visited at Arbuthnott a few miles from Laurencekirk.

Fred Urquhart worked on the land in the Laurencekirk district during the Second World War, and his short stories make use of his observations of rural life there.

Notable residents
 Very Rev George Cook (1772-1845), minister of Laurencekirk and Moderator of the General Assembly of the Church of Scotland
 Francis Garden, Lord Gardenstone (1721-1793), founder of Laurencekirk.
 James Henderson (1823-1906), influential newspaper and magazine publisher.
 Sir Robert Pearson (1871-1954), cricketer, advocate and chairman of the London Stock Exchange.
 James Andrew Robbie FRSE (1910-1977), geologist.
 Thomas Ruddiman served as the parish schoolmaster from 1695 to 1700.
 Alexander Charles Stephen FRSE (1893-1966), zoologist.
 Fred Urquhart (1912-1995), writer.
 Ryan Gauld (1995-), "The Scottish Messi".

References

External links

 Laurencekirk area community website

 
Towns in Aberdeenshire